Magyarbánhegyes is a village in Békés County, in the Southern Great Plain region of south-east Hungary.

In the 19th century, a small Jewish community lived in the village, many of whose members were murdered in the Holocaust, also the village also has an old Jewish cemetery,

Geography
It covers an area of 36.56 km² and has a population of 2691 people (2001).

This source shows this place as Magyar-Banhegyes, Austria-Hungary as place of invention pg 798 in 1888

References

Populated places in Békés County
Jewish communities destroyed in the Holocaust